The Koenigsegg CC8S is a mid-engine sports car produced by the Swedish automobile manufacturer Koenigsegg. It was the company's first production automobile and the first production car to use the company's trademark dihedral synchro-helix actuation doors. At its introduction, it won several awards, including the Guinness World Record for the Most Powerful Production Engine and design awards from both Red Dot in Germany and Utmärkt Svensk Form in Sweden.

Development
The CC8S was developed from the CC prototype. It was the culmination of 8 years of research and development. Despite limited resources, the chassis, suspension, brakes, and several other components were designed in-house by Koenigsegg. The pre-production car was shown at the 2000 Paris Auto Show, the public's reaction to the car was favourable and international contacts were made. The car had many unique functions such as the roof, which could be stored in the car's trunk located in the front similar to how a Chevrolet Corvette stores its roof (other Targa top sports cars of the time such as the Ferrari F50 lacked this feature), vertical opening doors dubbed dihedral synchro-helix actuation doors and a central patented free-flowing exhaust system based on the 'Rocket Cat Principle'. These unique features and design received great praise from the spectators, despite large orders, only 6 cars were produced due to high production costs out of which, 2 were right-hand drive. The CC8S was replaced by the more powerful CCR model in 2004.

Overview

Body
The body is a two-door, two-seat targa top design, meaning a portion of the roof can be removed and stored under the bonnet. The chassis is made from kevlar-reinforced carbon fibre. The kevlar-reinforced carbon fibre semi-monocoque is attached to a steel subframe at the front of the chassis, and an aluminium subframe at the rear.

The engine, transmission, and rear suspension are mounted to the aluminium subframe. All body panels are made from carbon fibre, and venturi tunnels and diffusers occupy the bottom of the car. These components increase downforce in conjunction with a rear-mounted spoiler.

Engine and Transmission
The CC8S is powered by a supercharged Ford Modular 4.6–litre DOHC V8 engine made of cast aluminium with 4 valves per cylinder and carbon fibre covers weighing , with a compression ratio of 8.6:1. The redline is set to 7,250 rpm. The engine powers the rear wheels through a 6-speed manual transmission specially developed for the car by CIMA.

Wheels
The CC8S uses magnesium alloy wheels with center-locking hubs, to which 225/40ZR 18" front and 335/40ZR 20" rear Michelin Pilot Sport 2 tyres are mounted. The brake calipers contain 6 pistons in front and 4 pistons at the rear. The brakes are power-assisted by the Koenigsegg Advanced Control System.

Performance
Manufacturer estimates
 Acceleration:  under 3.5 seconds
 Top speed: 
 Standing : 10 seconds, trap speed 
 Braking distance:

See also 
 Timeline of most powerful production cars
 Koenigsegg CC850

References

External links

 CC8S at official Koenigsegg website
 Koenigsegg technical data
 Modern Racer

Cars introduced in 2002
Cars discontinued in 2003
CC8S
Sports cars
Rear mid-engine, rear-wheel-drive vehicles